Earl of Dorset is a title that has been created at least four times in the Peerage of England. Some of its holders have at various times also held the rank of marquess and, from 1720, duke.

A possible first creation is not well documented. About 1070 Osmund, or Osmer, is said to have been created earl of Dorset, but the authority is a very late one and Osmund described himself simply as bishop. William de Mohun appears as earl of Dorset or Somerset, these two shires being in early times united under a single sheriff.

It was later created in 1411 for Thomas Beaufort, who was later created Duke of Exeter. The peerages became extinct on his death. It was next created in 1441 for Edmund Beaufort who was later created first Marquess of Dorset (1442) and then Duke of Somerset (1446). These titles were forfeited by the second duke in 1464.

The last creation was in 1604 for Thomas Sackville, 1st Baron Buckhurst. In 1720 the seventh earl was created Duke of Dorset in the Peerage of Great Britain. On the death of the fifth duke in 1843 the peerages became extinct.

Earls of Dorset; First creation (1070)
Osmund de Sees, Earl of Dorset (died 1099)

Earls of Dorset: Second creation (1411)
see Duke of Exeter

Earls of Dorset; Third creation (1441)
see Duke of Somerset

Earls of Dorset: Fourth creation (1604)
see Duke of Dorset

References

Dorset
Noble titles created in 1070
Noble titles created in 1411
Noble titles created in 1441
Noble titles created in 1604